Choeromorpha muscaria is a species of beetle in the family Cerambycidae. It was described by Heller in 1915.

References

Choeromorpha
Beetles described in 1915